Morpho peleides, the Peleides blue morpho, common morpho or the emperor is an iridescent  tropical butterfly found in Mexico, Central America, northern South America, Paraguay and Trinidad. 
Most authorities believe that peleides is a subspecies of Morpho helenor.

The brilliant blue color in the butterfly's wings is caused by the diffraction of the light from millions of tiny scales on its wings. It uses this to frighten away predators, by flashing its wings rapidly. The entire blue morpho butterfly life cycle, from egg to adult is only 115 days. This butterfly undergoes metamorphosis from larva to butterfly. The larva eats plant leaves before spinning a chrysalis. Flower nectar, which is available later in the year, is used by the butterfly. A recent study also discovered that during transformation, the butterfly substantially reduces its body weight and body fat. Known larval food plants are Leguminosae (Arachis hypogaea, Dioclea wilsonii, Inga species, Lonchocarpus, Machaerium cobanense, Machaerium salvadorense, Machaerium seemannii, Medicago sativa, Mucuna mutisiana, Pithecellobium, Pterocarpus rohrii, Mucuna urens) and  Bignoniaceae (Paragonia pyramidata).
Morpho peleides drinks the juices from rotting fruits for food. Its favorites in captivity are mango, kiwi, and lychee. Morpho peleides butterflies live in the rainforests of South America, and can be found in Mexico and Central America.

The larvae of Morpho peleides butterflies are occasional cannibals. These caterpillars are red brown with patches of bright green.

Photographs

See also
Morpho helenor
Morpho menelaus, Menelaus blue morpho

References

External links 

 Butterflies of America Images of type and other specimens of  Morpho helenor peleides
Morpho peleides, Blue Morpho at Flickr, showing the spectacular iridescence
Time lapse video of newly emerged imago expanding its wings
NSG Specimen. Photograph of underside.

Morpho
Nymphalidae of South America
Butterflies described in 1850